Hendrella heringi is a species of tephritid or fruit flies in the genus Hendrella of the family Tephritidae.

Distribution
New Ireland.

References

Tephritinae
Insects described in 1970
Diptera of Asia